The Edmond Ellison Smart House, in Leesville in Vernon Parish, Louisiana, is believed to have been built in about 1870.  It was listed on the National Register of Historic Places in 2002.

It was the longtime home of Dr. Edmond Ellison Smart (d.1908), founder of the town of Leesville.

The house's architectural style is not clear, but in general terms is consistent with Greek Revival and Italianate influences.  The house has a broad hip roof and a gallery which encircled the house, but which is now enclosed at the rear.

References

Houses in Vernon Parish, Louisiana
Houses on the National Register of Historic Places in Louisiana
Houses completed in 1870
National Register of Historic Places in Vernon Parish, Louisiana